Mlýny (English: The Mills) is a Czech comedy play based on the early work of Václav Havel and Karel Brynda: Žít po svém (Live My Life).

Story 
The storyline is set in a military unit during the socialist era. The simple intrigue showed shooting a civilist for guard's service. A starting point of this satiric comedy depicts people's army as totally absurd "machine" destroying people's characters.

Productions

Divadlo Sklep 
Directed by Ondřej Trojan and Jiří Fero Burda. The play had its premiere in 1994.
Jan Slovák .... Lance Corporal Milan Maršík
Jiří Fero Burda .... Private Marián Šimák/Ghost
Petr Koutecký .... Private Čapek
Otakáro Schmidt .... Private Houska
František Fáňa Váša .... des. Abs. Toman
Monika Načeva .... Technical Sergeant Boženka
Tomáš Hanák .... Lieutenant Horáček
David Vávra .... Lieutenant Colonel Malík
Ondřej Trojan .... Captain Sládek
Robert Nebřenský .... Major Buzgo
Luboš Veselý .... trumpeter

External links 
Critique in Czechoslovak Film Database
Mlýny in Facebook

Comedy plays
Satirical plays
Czech plays
Off-Broadway plays